The Witherill Farm is a historic farm property on Witherill Road in Shoreham, Vermont.  With a history dating to the late 18th century, the farm was for two centuries managed by generations of the same family, and was a noted early exporter of merino sheep to South Africa.  Most of the farmstead buildings were built before 1850.  The property was listed on the National Register of Historic Places in 1993.

Description and history
The Witherill Farm is located in central western Shoreham, and is roughly bisected by Witherill Road, a town road extending westward from Vermont Route 74.  The farmstead consists of four buildings, two on either side of the road.  To the north stands what was originally a small blacksmith shop, a -story gabled wood-frame structure that recently served as a garage, but has seen a variety of uses over time.  East of it stands the main farmhouse, an 1857 Greek Revival structure two stories in height and three bays wide, with a wraparound single-story porch.  Across the street stand two barns: a c. 1820 sheep barn, and an 1809 apple packing barn.  Both have rubblestone foundations and timber framing, with clapboard walls.  At the time of the property's National Register operation, most of the farm's  were in agricultural use as an apple orchard.

The farm's history dates to 1785, when Ebenezer Turrill purchased the land from one of Shoreham's original proprietors. The farm has been worked by successive generations of Turrill's descendants. Originally a diversified farm producing a variety of products, it was specialized into merino sheep farming in the late 19th century, with its sheep being among early exports to South America and South Africa, its operators making several trips to the latter area to further this trade. The Witherills were among the first in the area to produce apples for commercial distribution, acting as founding members of a local cooperative established for the purpose. As of 1993, the farm continued to be worked by the Witherills.

See also
National Register of Historic Places listings in Addison County, Vermont

References

Historic districts on the National Register of Historic Places in Vermont
National Register of Historic Places in Addison County, Vermont
Greek Revival architecture in Vermont
Buildings and structures completed in 1809
Buildings and structures in Shoreham, Vermont
Farms on the National Register of Historic Places in Vermont